Amoanda is a small town and a sub of Gomoa East district in the Central Region of Ghana.

References

Populated places in the Central Region (Ghana)